Iquiracetima is a genus of longhorn beetles of the subfamily Lamiinae, containing the following species:

 Iquiracetima aspasia Galileo & Martins, 1995
 Iquiracetima brachialis (Thomson, 1868)
 Iquiracetima cerari Galileo & Martins, 2008
 Iquiracetima rana Galileo & Martins, 2008
 Iquiracetima tuberosa (Belon, 1896)

References

Eupromerini